The General Grant tree is the largest giant sequoia (Sequoiadendron giganteum) in the General Grant Grove section of Kings Canyon National Park in California and the second largest giant sequoia tree in the world. Once thought to be well over 2,000 years old, recent estimates suggest the General Grant tree is closer to 1,650 years old.

History
The tree was named in 1867 after Ulysses S. Grant, Union Army general and the 18th President of the United States (1869–1877). President Calvin Coolidge proclaimed it the "Nation's Christmas Tree" on April 28, 1926. Due in large part to its huge base, the General Grant tree was thought to be the largest tree in the world prior to 1931, when the first precise measurements indicated that the General Sherman was slightly larger. On March 29, 1956, President Dwight D. Eisenhower declared the tree a "National Shrine", a memorial to those who died in war. It is the only living object to be so declared.

In September 2003, General Grant moved up one place in the giant sequoia size rankings when the Washington tree lost its crown and the hollow upper half of its trunk after a fire caused by a lightning strike.

Dimensions

See also
 List of largest giant sequoias
 List of individual trees
 List of oldest trees

References

External links

 Virtual Grant Tree Walk 
 
 The largest giant sequoias by trunk volume

Individual giant sequoia trees
Kings Canyon National Park